Mariosousa heterophylla, also called the palo blanco tree (which is also applied to Ipomoea arborescens), palo liso, guinola, and Willard acacia, is a normally evergreen mimosoid plant in the genus Mariosousa native to Mexico. The Spanish common name translates into 'white stick', defining its peeling white bark. A compound called willardiine, that acts as an agonist in glutamate receptors, can be isolated from M. heterophylla.

Description
It is a very slender tree with few branches as well as leaves. The petiolar-rachis is characteristically long and functions as a cladophyll. it has a white or yellow-colored peeling off bark. The leaves have 5–6 leaflets in the end. It may drop leaves in autumn and winter. The flowers are like catkins, rod or bottle-brush-like, white or light yellow in color. The pods are multichambered, and 3–4 in long specimens. The flowers occur in pale yellow spikes.

Distribution and habitat
The plant is endemic to Sonora (Sonoran desert), Mexico. It prefers rocky bajdas, slopes and arroyos from 0 to 2,000 feet elevation. It is a popular ornamental tree in arid areas, especially in the southwestern U.S.

References

Flora of Mexico
heterophylla
Flora of the Sonoran Deserts
Plants described in 1890